Albert Speer was a 2000 play by the British playwright David Edgar on the life of the Nazi architect Albert Speer, based on the book Albert Speer: His Battle with Truth by Gitta Sereny. It premiered that year at the Lyttelton auditorium of the Royal National Theatre, with the title role played by Alex Jennings and the role of Hitler played by Roger Allam. The play was directed by Trevor Nunn.

References

External links
National Theatre - Production page for Albert Speer
David Edgar writes about his play

2000 plays
Plays based on real people
Plays based on books
Plays about the Holocaust
Plays about World War II
Biographical plays about military leaders
Plays about Nazi Germany
Plays by David Edgar
Cultural depictions of Adolf Hitler
Cultural depictions of Albert Speer